Northeast Grocery is the parent company of Tops Friendly Markets, Price Chopper and Market 32. The company was formed after a merger in 2021 which gives the company nearly 300 stores in the northeast United States.

History
On February 8, 2021, Price Chopper Supermarkets/Market 32 and Tops Market announced plans to merge. The new parent company would be headquartered in Schenectady, New York. The Price Chopper/Market 32 and Tops Markets businesses will retain main offices in Schenectady and Williamsville and will continue to be managed locally by their respective leaders.

Nine months later, the merger was completed. The stores will now be owned and overseen by Northeast Grocery, with current President and CEO of Price Chopper/Market 32 managing the merger & Tops Friendly Markets CEO Frank Curci taking over in February 2022. The FTC required the combined company to divest from 12 of the combined companies’ stores.

Store Locations

 Tops Markets - 149 stores and 5 gas station/convenience stores 
 Market 32 by Price Chopper - 131 stores in six states: (Upstate New York, Vermont, Connecticut, Massachusetts, New Hampshire, and Pennsylvania)

References

Companies based in Schenectady County, New York
American companies established in 2021
Retail companies established in 2021